David Armitage may refer to:

David Armitage (historian) (born 1965), British historian
David Armitage (footballer) (born 1988), Australian footballer
David Armitage Bannerman (1886–1979), British ornithologist